Feering Halt was on the Kelvedon and Tollesbury Light Railway, serving the village of Feering, Essex.

The halt station was opened by the London and North Eastern Railway, which had acquired the Kelvedon and Tollesbury Light Railway upon the 1923 Grouping as part of the Great Eastern Railway.

The halt was closed, along with the rest of the line, on 7 May 1951.

References

External links
 Feering Halt station on navigable 1948 O. S. map

Disused railway stations in Essex
Former London and North Eastern Railway stations
Railway stations in Great Britain opened in 1934
Railway stations in Great Britain closed in 1951
1951 disestablishments in England